Ek Khondo Jomi is a 2004 Bangladeshi film starring Raisul Islam Asad and Champa. The film is made from poet Shahabuddin Nagri's 2003 poem of the same title. Nagri wrote it in 2003 Ekushey Book Fair. Nagri also wrote the script and the songs of the film. Ek Khondo Jomi is the first Bangladeshi feature film made from a poem, confirmed by the director himself. For Shahjahan, who earlier made films like Pinjor (1976), Shotru (1986) and Uttarer Khep (2002), this film is his fourth stint as a director.

Soundtrack

Awards

References

External links 
 

2004 films
Bengali-language Bangladeshi films
Films scored by Sheikh Sadi Khan
2000s Bengali-language films
Impress Telefilm films